Phylloxiphia vicina is a moth of the family Sphingidae. It is found from Liberia to Nigeria and to Tanzania and Zambia.

References

Phylloxiphia
Moths described in 1915
Moths of Africa